Kokk or KOKK may refer to:
KOKK, a  radio station licensed to serve Huron, South Dakota, USA
KOKK, ICAO code for Kokomo Municipal Airport, Indiana, USA
Kokk (surname), Estonian surname literally meaning "cook"